Bravničar is a Slovene surname. Notable people with the surname include:

 Dejan Bravničar (1937–2018), Slovene violinist
 Gizela Bravničar (1908–1990), Slovene ballet dancer
 Matija Bravničar (1897–1977), Slovene composer

See also
 

Slovene-language surnames